Chen Da is a fictional character in Water Margin, one of the Four Great Classical Novels of Chinese literature. Nicknamed "Stream Leaping Tiger", he ranks 72nd among the 108 Stars of Destiny and 36th among the 72 Earthly Fiends.

Background
Chen Da is depicted as impatient and hot-tempered with a loud booming voice. Nicknamed "Stream Leaping Tiger", he fights well with an iron spear.

Originally from Ye (present-day Handan, Hebei), Chen Da is one of the three bandit chiefs at Mount Shaohua (少華山; southeast of present-day Hua County, Shaanxi), ranked second between Zhu Wu and Yang Chun. The three would plunder the nearby counties  when their grain stock runs low for replenishment.

Befriending Shi Jin
One day Chen Da suggests raiding the well-stocked Huayin County for grain as the stronghold is facing insufficiency. But Zhu Wu objects, warning that the route to Huayin runs past the Shi Family Village where he might encounter the formidable fighter Shi Jin. Dismissing Zhu as cowardly, Chen Da leads some men towards Huayin.

Just as Zhu Wu has foreseen, Shi Jin blocks the path of Chen Da and captures him in a one-on-one horseback combat. Upon hearing that, Zhu Wu goes with Yang Chun to plead with Shi Jin to arrest them as well so that they can fulfil their oath of dying together. Moved by their bond, Shi Jin frees Chen Da and befriends the three. Henceforth, the two sides often exchange gifts and visit each other for drink.

One day a hunter finds a reply letter from Mount Shaohua on a servant of Shi Jin, who has fallen drunk in a grove after an errand to invite the outlaws to attend a feast at his master's house. The matter is reported to the authorities, which send an arrest party to Shi's house on the night of the gathering. Finding his manor besieged, Shi Jin burns it down and fights his way out with the bandit chiefs. They get to Mount Shaohua safely, where Shi Jin becomes the chief after failing to locate his teacher Wang Jin in Weizhou.

Joining Liangshan
Shi Jin tries to save a woman abducted by Governor He of Hua Prefecture, or Huazhou, but falls into the latter's trap and is captured. Lu Zhishen, who has come to invite Shi Jin to join the Liangshan Marsh, tries to rescue him but also falls into He's ambush. The Mount Shaohua outlaws turn to Liangshan for help. At Huazhou, the force from Liangshan lure He out of the city and kill him. After Shi and Lu are rescued, the Mount Shaohua bandits, including Chen Da, are absorbed into Liangshan.

Campaigns and death
Chen Da is appointed as one of the leaders of the Liangshan cavalry after the 108 Stars of Destiny came together in what is called the Grand Assembly. He participates in the campaigns against the Liao invaders and rebel forces on Song territory following amnesty from Emperor Huizong for Liangshan.

In the attack on Yuling Pass (昱嶺關; near present-day Zhupu Village, She County, Anhui) in the campaign against Fang La, Chen Da, Shi Jin and four other heroes face the enemy general Pang Wanchun. Pang kills Shi Jin with a shot while his archers rain arrows on Chen and the rest, killing all of them.

References
 
 
 
 
 
 
 

72 Earthly Fiends
Fictional characters from Hebei